Chlamydoselachus garmani is an extinct species of large frilled shark from the Miocene. Fossils have been found in Germany.

Description
The teeth of Chlamydoselachus garmani are almost twice the size of the extant C. anguineus , making it a possible 2.7-3.6 m (9-12 ft) long and its roots meso-distally broad and labio-lingually short.

References

Chlamydoselachidae